Elul (Standard ʾElūl, Tiberian ʾĔlūl) is the twelfth month of the Jewish civil year and the sixth month of the ecclesiastical year on the Hebrew calendar. It is a month of 29 days. Elul usually occurs in August–September on the Gregorian calendar.

Etymology
The name of the month Elul, like the names of the rest of the Hebrew calendar months, was brought from the Babylonian captivity, and originated from the Akkadian word for "harvest". A similar month name was also used in Akkadian, in the form Elūlu. The month is known as Araḫ Ulūlu, "harvest month", in the Babylonian calendar. Eylül is also the name for September in Turkish; this is derived from  ʾAylūl, used in Iraq and the Levant (see Arabic names of calendar months), from Classical Syriac ܐܝܼܠܘܼܠ ʾĪlūl, also tracing its origin from the Akkadian word Elūlu. In Hebrew, a popular bacronym for Elul is from a verse in the Song of Songs "Ani LeDodi VeDodi Li" (Chapter 6, verse 3A).

Customs
In Jewish tradition, the month of Elul is a time of repentance in preparation for the High Holy Days of Rosh Hashanah and Yom Kippur. The word "Elul" is similar to the root of the verb "search" in Aramaic. Jewish sources from the 14th century and on write that the Hebrew word "Elul" can be understood to be an bacronym for the phrase "Ani L'dodi V'dodi Li" – "I am my beloved's and my beloved is mine", referring to one's relationship with God. Elul is seen as a time to search one's heart and draw close to God in preparation for the coming Day of Judgement, Rosh Hashanah, and Day of Atonement, Yom Kippur. Rabbi Shneur Zalman of Liadi compared, by way of analogy, the month of Elul to a king visiting his peasants in the field before returning to his palace.

During the month of Elul, there are a number of special rituals leading up to the High Holy Days. It is customary to blow the shofar every morning (except on Shabbat) from Rosh Hodesh Elul (the first day of the month) until the day before Rosh Hashanah. The blasts are meant to awaken one's spirits and inspire believers to begin the soul searching which will prepare them for the High Holy Days. As part of this preparation, Elul is the time to begin the sometimes-difficult process of granting and asking for forgiveness. It is also customary to recite a Psalm 27 every day from Rosh Hodesh Elul through Hoshanah Rabbah on Sukkot (in Tishrei).

Aside from the blowing of the shofar, the other significant ritual practice during Elul is to recite selichot (special penitential prayers) either every morning before sunrise beginning on the Sunday immediately before Rosh Hashanah, or, if starting Sunday would not afford four days of selichot, then the Sunday one week prior (Ashkenazi tradition) or every morning during the entire month of Elul (Sephardi tradition). Ashkenazi Jews begin the recitation of selichot with a special service on Saturday night between solar mid-night (not 12:00) and morning light on the first day of Selichot.

Many Jews also visit the graves of loved ones throughout the month in order to remember and honor those people in our past who inspire us to live more fully in the future.

Another social custom is to begin or end all letters written during the month of Elul with wishes that the recipient have a good year. The standard blessing is "K'tiva VaHatima Tova" ("a good writing and sealing [of judgement]"), meaning that the person should be written and sealed in the Book of Life for a good year. Tradition teaches that on Rosh Hashanah, each person is written down for a good or a poor year, based on their actions in the previous one, and their sincere efforts at atoning for mistakes or harm. On Yom Kippur, that fate is "sealed."

Elul in Jewish history
 1 Elul (1313 BCE) – Moses ascends Mount Sinai for 3rd set of 40 days
 1 Elul (520 BCE) – The Prophet Haggai commands that the rebuilding of the Second Temple continue
 2 Elul (1555) – Shulchan Aruch published
 3 Elul (1935) – Death of Abraham Isaac Kook
 5 Elul – Ezekiel the prophet has a prophecy of the destruction of Solomon's Temple
 10 Elul (2105 BCE) – Noah dispatches raven
 12 Elul (1294) – Birth of Nachmanides
 12 Elul (1945) – Rabbi Shlomo Zev Zweigenhaft publicly performs the first shechitah on German soil since it was outlawed by the Nazis in 1933.
 13 Elul (1909) – Death of Yosef Hayyim
 15 Elul (1964) – birth of Watson de Emmanuel, OBE
 17 Elul (2105 BCE) – Noah dispatches dove
 18 Elul (1609) – Death of Judah Loew ben Bezalel
 18 Elul (1698) – Birth of Baal Shem Tov
 18 Elul (1745) – Birth of rabbi Shneur Zalman of Liadi
 23 Elul (2105 BCE) – Dove brings olive Leaf to Noah 
 23 Elul (1942) – Death of the Grand Rabbi of Aleksander, Yitzchak Menachem Danziger, in Treblinka
 23 Elul (2001) – Attack of 9/11 on the World Trade Center in New York City
 24 Elul (1933) – Death of Israel Meir Kagan
 25 Elul (3761 BCE) – The 1st day of the world according to the Genesis creation narrative
 25 Elul (335 BCE) – Jerusalem Walls Rebuilt
 25 Elul (2nd century CE) – Death of Eleazar ben Simeon, son of Simeon bar Yochai
 27 Elul (1855 CE) – Death of Sholom Rokeach
 28 Elul (1983 CE) – Death of Rabbi Yoel Halpern
 29 Elul (1789 CE) – Birth of Menachem Mendel Schneersohn

See also
 Jewish astrology
 Repentance in Judaism
 Rosh Hashanah LaBehema
 Song of Songs
 Ellul

References

External links
 Dates of Elul
 Resources on the Month of Elul 
 The month of Elul
 An in-depth discussion of the tradition of hearing shofar on Elul, plus meditations on the sound of shofar for each day of the month, can be found at The Shofar of Elul
 Jewels of Elul: A reading for each day of Elul from a diverse background of Jewish sources.

 
Months of the Hebrew calendar